The men's individual recurve open archery discipline at the 2020 Summer Paralympics will be contested from 27 August to 3 September.

In the ranking rounds each archer shoots 72 arrows, and is seeded according to score. In the knock-out stages each archer shoots three arrows per set against an opponent, the scores being aggregated. Losing semifinalists compete in a bronze medal match. As the field contained 31 archers, the single highest-ranked archer in the ranking round, will progress directly to the round of 16 places.

Ranking round
The ranking round of the men's individual recurve event was held on 27 August.

Knockout rounds
The knockout rounds will be held on 3 September 2021.

Top half

Bottom half

Finals

References

Archery at the 2020 Summer Paralympics